Labeo mokotoensis is one of 103 fish species in the genus Labeo. It has only ever been recorded in Lake Ndaraga in the Congo Basin of the Democratic Republic of the Congo.

References 

Labeo
Fish described in 1939
Endemic fauna of the Democratic Republic of the Congo